Gintautas Paluckas (born 19 August 1979) is a Lithuanian politician.

Biography 
In 1997 graduated from Panevėžys J. Balčikonis Gymnasium, from 2000 to 2001 he studied English at Charles Dickens College in London. In 2003 he graduated from the Vilnius University Faculty of Mathematics and Informatics, in 2004 from International Business School. Since 2004 studies at VU Faculty of Law.

From 2003 to 2005 he served as the Chief Specialist at Lithuanian Social insurance institution (Sodra). Since 2005 he served as the Assistant to European Parliament member Justas Paleckis. From 2007 to 2009 he was Director of Administration of the Vilnius city municipality.
In 2012 The final and unappealable decision of the Supreme Court of Lithuania found the service guilty of abusing the service in a non-transparent public procurement tender.

Since 2013 Paluckas was Executive Secretary of the Lithuanian Social Democratic Party, Member of the LSDP Council and Board.

From 2015 to 2019 Paluckas served as Deputy Mayor of Vilnius.

He is an author of several articles and political reviews in the national press.

In 2017 Paluckas won leadership election of the Social Democratic Party of Lithuania after defeating then-Minister of Economy Mindaugas Sinkevičius in a run-off. After leadership election, the party decided to leave a ruling coalition via survey of all its members. As a result of a decision, majority of its members of the Seimas left the party to form a new one, Social Democratic Labour Party of Lithuania, and remain in the ruling coalition. Paluckas was reelected as a leader of the party in 2019.

After poor results in the parliamentary elections of 2020, Paluckas faced criticism over his decision to support the Lithuanian Farmers and Greens Union candidates in the second round of elections. Initially, he stated his willingness to take part in the leadership elections of 2021, but after negative assessment in the party's board, Paluckas resigned on January 22, 2021.

References 

Social Democratic Party of Lithuania politicians
1979 births
People from Panevėžys
Vilnius University alumni
Vice-mayors of places in Lithuania
Living people